László Gellér (born 5 August 1944) is a Hungarian ski jumper. He competed at the 1964 Winter Olympics and the 1968 Winter Olympics.

References

External links
 

1944 births
Living people
Hungarian male ski jumpers
Olympic ski jumpers of Hungary
Ski jumpers at the 1964 Winter Olympics
Ski jumpers at the 1968 Winter Olympics
People from Tótkomlós
Sportspeople from Békés County
20th-century Hungarian people